Wolfchase Galleria is a regional shopping mall in northeast Memphis, Tennessee, United States. The mall is managed by Simon Property Group. It is located across the street from the Bartlett city limits at the intersection of Germantown Parkway and Interstate 40. Wolfchase Galleria features 117 stores and a food court. The anchor stores are Macy's, JCPenney, Dillard's, and Malco Theatres. There is 1 vacant anchor store that was once Sears.

In 2015, Sears Holdings spun off 235 of its properties, including the Sears at Wolfchase Galleria, into Seritage Growth Properties.

On October 15, 2018, it was announced that Sears would be closing as part of a plan to close 142 stores nationwide.

Anchors

Current 
 JCPenney
 Macy's
 Dillard's

Former 
 Sears
 Goldsmith's

See also
List of shopping malls in Tennessee

References

External links
Wolfchase Galleria
Directory of stores in Wolfchase Galleria

Simon Property Group
Shopping malls in Tennessee
Buildings and structures in Memphis, Tennessee
Tourist attractions in Memphis, Tennessee
Shopping malls established in 1997
1997 establishments in Tennessee